Puʻunēnē is an unincorporated community in the central part of Maui, Hawaii, United States, near Kahului with a population of around 50. Although the land is fairly level, the Hawaiian language name  means " goose hill".

Background
Puʻunēnē's primary industry was growing, harvesting and processing sugarcane for over a century but production ceased in 2016. In 2019, a field of potatoes was planted by Mahi Pono where sugar cane used to be grown. This  initial planting was the beginning of using these fallow lands to increase local food production.

The Alexander & Baldwin Sugar Museum is housed in the former residence of the superintendent of Puʻunene Sugar Mill, which the Hawaiian Commercial & Sugar Company (a division of Alexander & Baldwin) operated across the street since 1901. Its mission is "to preserve and present the history and heritage of Hawaii's sugar industry, and the multi-ethnic plantation life which it engendered."  Also located in Puʻunēnē is the Puʻunēnē School, which is listed on the National Register of Historic Places.

About three miles to the south of Puʻunēnē is the site of a former Naval Air Station (1940–1947),. This would later be known as Pu’unēnē Airport, and was the site for the second Maui Airport, after Maalaea, and part of the struggle to achieve an adequate landing strip of the Island of Maui for Hawaiian Airlines to use. An old runway is now used as a drag strip for Maui Raceway Park.

Puʻunēnē's ZIP code is 96784.

Gallery

References

External links

Maui Humane Society (based in Puʻunene)

Unincorporated communities in Maui County, Hawaii
Sugar plantations in Hawaii
Populated places on Maui
Unincorporated communities in Hawaii
Company towns in Hawaii
Alexander & Baldwin

Closed installations of the United States Navy